Karin Tülling (born 19 April 1955) is a retired German freestyle swimmer who won a bronze medal at the 1970 European Aquatics Championships. She competed at the 1972 Summer Olympics in the 200 m, 400 m and 800 m freestyle and finished eighth in the 200 m event.

References

1955 births
Living people
German female swimmers
East German female freestyle swimmers
Swimmers at the 1972 Summer Olympics
Olympic swimmers of East Germany
European Aquatics Championships medalists in swimming